Lavci is a village in the Bitola Municipality, North Macedonia near the city of Bitola. It is located on Baba mountain connecting with Bitola with the road "Lavchanski pat" (Лавчански пат).

Demographics
According to the 2002 census, the village had a total of 338 inhabitants. Ethnic groups in the village include:

Macedonians 336
Others 2

References

Villages in Bitola Municipality